Capital Center South Tower is a high-rise office building located at 201 North Illinois Street in Indianapolis, Indiana. It was completed in 1987 and is 22 stories tall.

See also
List of tallest buildings in Indianapolis
List of tallest buildings in Indiana

References

External links

Capitol Center South Tower at Skyscraper Page
Capitol Center South Tower at Emporis

Skyscraper office buildings in Indianapolis

Office buildings completed in 1987
1987 establishments in Indiana